The Hidden Scar  is a 1916 silent film directed by Barry O'Neil and starring Ethel Clayton and Holbrook Blinn. It was distributed by the World Film Company.

The film is preserved incomplete in the Library of Congress in Washington D.C. and National Archives of Canada in Ottawa. Prints and/or fragments were found in the Dawson Film Find in 1978.

Cast
Ethel Clayton - Janet Hall
Holbrook Blinn - Stuart Doane
Irving Cummings - Dale Overton
Montagu Love - Henry Dalton
Madge Evans - Dot
Edward Kimball - Reverend James Overton
Eugenie Woodward - Mrs. Overton

References

External links
 The Hidden Scar at IMDb.com

1916 films
American silent feature films
American black-and-white films
World Film Company films
Silent American drama films
1916 drama films
Films directed by Barry O'Neil
1910s American films
1910s English-language films